The Grand Prix of Baltimore presented by SRT was an IndyCar Series and American Le Mans Series race for 3 years held on a street circuit in Baltimore, Maryland. The inaugural race was held September 4, 2011.  ESPN said it was the best inaugural street race in North America in the last 30 years.  The races were contested on a temporary street circuit around the Inner Harbor area of downtown Baltimore. 

Baltimore Racing Development signed a multi-year contract with IndyCar and the City of Baltimore to organize the race, but the city terminated their contract with BRD at the end of 2011 due to unpaid debts. On February 15, 2012 it was announced that the city of Baltimore had entered into a five-year agreement with Downforce Racing to manage the race. However, Downforce failed to fulfill their obligations to the city. On May 10, 2012 it was announced that Race On LLC. and Andretti Sports Marketing, led by racing legend Michael Andretti would take over the organization and promotion of the event.  Race On LLC is owned by Gregory O'Neill and J.P. Grant III. On September 13, 2013 it was announced that the race would not be held in 2014 or 2015 due to scheduling conflicts.

Circuit 
The circuit is a  temporary street circuit that is run in a clockwise direction, with the start-finish line located on Pratt Street, passing by various Baltimore landmarks, including the Baltimore Convention Center, the Inner Harbor, and Camden Yards. The cars travel east along Pratt Street to Light Street, where they turn right and travel south along the northbound lanes to the intersection between Light and Lee Streets. This forms the slowest corner on the circuit, a right-hand hairpin turn that leads the cars back north along Light Street's southbound lanes to Conway Street. The cars turn left here and head west along Conway Street to the Camden Station. They then navigate a chicane designed to slow the cars down before the pit entry — the circuit is unusual in that the pits are not located on the main straight — and turn left again. The cars circle around Oriole Park at Camden Yards stadium to Russell Street, where they turn north once more. Finally, the cars navigate a temporary chicane placed at the junction between Pratt and Howard Street as they cross train lines.

Following the 2011 race, several drivers offered the opinion that the temporary chicane on the main straight was unnecessary, and it was subsequently removed ahead of the 2012 race so as to increase entry speeds into the first corner. However, during the first practice sessions for the 2012 race, several drivers — including Simon Pagenaud and Oriol Servià — became airborne as they crossed the train tracks. IndyCar officials abandoned the practice session and reinstalled the temporary chicane.

Other changes for the 2012 race included the re-profiling of the chicane before the pit entry. In 2011, the circuit had been narrowed down to a single lane with several tight corners to force the cars to slow down. This was simplified for 2012 and widened, slowing the cars down, but preventing the field from being forced through a bottleneck.

Past winners

IndyCar Series

American Le Mans Series

Support races

Lap Records 
The unofficial all-time outright track record set during a race weekend is 1:17.5921, set by Will Power in a Dallara DW12 during qualifying for the 2012 Grand Prix of Baltimore. The official race lap records at the Grand Prix of Baltimore are listed as:

Controversy 

Along with the closing of the commercial center of downtown Baltimore for track preparation, trees were removed from city streets, spawning a court case.  Also, Baltimore Brew identified $42,400 in campaign contributions over the preceding four years to Mayor Stephanie Rawlings-Blake and other political officials from investors and businesses that stood to gain from the race being held.

After its inaugural run, it was reported that the race failed to bring as much economic activity to Baltimore as had been promised and that Baltimore Racing Development has had difficulties paying monies owed to local businesses and the state, the latter resulting in a $567,000 tax lien being filed.  With Baltimore Racing Development $3 million in debt, including nearly $1.2 million owed to Baltimore City, the city terminated their contract with BRD at the end of 2011. This meant the race would only take place again if both the city and IndyCar approved a new organizer.  IndyCar officials have expressed hope that a new organizer will be found. The city of Baltimore announced on February 10, 2012 that a five-year deal with race organizer Downforce Racing, LLC was being finalized and would be presented to the city Board of Estimates February 22. The new contract includes provisions such as a $3 per ticket surcharge for city services to reduce the risk of unpaid fees to the city.

References

External links

 
Sports competitions in Baltimore
Recurring sporting events established in 2011
2011 establishments in Maryland